Ruslan Myrsatayev (born May 7, 1985) is a Kazakh boxer best known for qualifying in the Super Heavyweight division(+91 kg) at the 2008 Summer Olympics.

Kazakhstan chose to send Ruslan over veteran Mukhtarkhan Dildabekov and big-punching Rustam Rygebayev who had competed at the 2007 World Championships to the second qualifier as Myrsatayev won the competition.

The 207 lb fighter quickly KOd Australian Daniel Beahan but was knocked down and outpointed by Chinese southpaw giant Zhang Zhilei.

External links
Qualifier
data
sports-reference

1985 births
Living people
Boxers at the 2008 Summer Olympics
Olympic boxers of Kazakhstan
Sportspeople from Almaty
Kazakhstani male boxers
Super-heavyweight boxers
21st-century Kazakhstani people